José Carlos Pessanha (born 29 April 1955), known as Zé Carlos, is a Brazilian footballer. He competed in the men's tournament at the 1976 Summer Olympics.

References

External links
 

1955 births
Living people
Brazilian footballers
Brazil international footballers
Olympic footballers of Brazil
Footballers at the 1976 Summer Olympics
People from Campos dos Goytacazes
Association football goalkeepers
Sportspeople from Rio de Janeiro (state)